PHP Studio (formerly Top PHP Studio) is a commercial code editor which is specialized in PHP programming language.

Features 
 Builtin HTTP server and integrated web browser for running PHP scripts.
 Syntax highlighting for PHP, HTML, JavaScript, SQL, and XML.
 Function hints for PHP
 Code Insight for HTML and PHP
 Automatic syntax checking
 File / FTP Explorer
 Code browser
 Project Manager

See also
List of PHP editors

External links 
Cayoren Software website
 PHP Editor Review at php editors

Integrated development environments